Vincent Salvatore Sunseri (born October 25, 1991) is a former American football safety and coach who is the running backs coach for the New England Patriots of the National Football League (NFL). He was drafted by the New Orleans Saints in the fifth round of the 2014 NFL Draft. He played college football at Alabama and in addition served as a graduate assistant at the university in 2019.

High school career
Sunseri began his career at Marvin Ridge High School in Waxhaw, North Carolina. As a junior, he made 107 tackles, 15 tackles for loss, two sacks, and five interceptions, while also rushing for 305 yards and three touchdowns. He moved to Northridge High School in January 2010; as a senior he recorded 144 tackles, 19 tackles for loss, three interceptions, four fumble recoveries, and two touchdowns. He was selected to play in the Under Armour All-America Game.

Considered a four-star recruit by ESPN.com, Sunseri was listed as the No. 18 outside linebacker in the nation in 2011.

College career
As a freshman in 2011, Sunseri was second on the team with 11 special teams tackles, all coming on kickoff coverage. He has 31 total tackles to rank eighth on the team. He also plays on the punt return team and has recorded several attention-grabbing blocks. Against Kent State, he set a career-high with six tackles, including three solo stops. Along with fellow freshman Trey DePriest, he registered several big hits on kickoff coverage. He also saw time at safety in the 48–7 win. He was selected as the coaches' Special Teams Player of the Week. Against Penn State, he did not have a tackle but was named a Special Teams Player of the Week with excellent coverage on the kickoff team and blocking on punt return. Against North Texas, he recorded another big tackle night with six stops split between special teams and safety. Sunseri had three solo tackles against the Mean Green. Against Arkansas, he assisted on two tackles in the win against the Razorbacks. Against Florida, he was named a Special Teams Player of the Week by the Alabama coaching staff. He recorded two solo tackles and forced a fumble. Against Ole Miss, Sunseri was once again named a Special Teams Player of the Week by the Alabama coaching staff. He totaled six tackles, including four solo stops, against the Rebels. Against Tennessee, he totaled two tackles, including a solo stop. He recovered his first career fumble in the win against the Volunteers. Against Georgia Southern, he was named one of the Alabama coaching staff's Special Teams Players of the Week. He recorded one solo tackle on kickoff coverage. Against Auburn, Sunseri tied a career-high with six tackles, including four solo stops. He recorded a quarterback hurry against the Tigers. He played significant time at safety in the second half against the Tigers.

NFL playing career

New Orleans Saints 
Sunseri was drafted by the New Orleans Saints in the fifth round, 167th overall, in the 2014 NFL Draft. On May 16, 2014, Sunseri signed a four-year contract with the Saints. On November 12, 2014, Sunseri was placed on injured reserve with an arm injury. On September 1, 2015, he was waived. 

On September 2, 2015, after clearing waivers, Sunseri was placed on injured reserve with a knee injury. On April 25, 2016, he was released.

New England Patriots 
On July 24, 2016, Sunseri was signed by the New England Patriots. On September 3, 2016, he was released by the Patriots as part of final roster cuts. On September 6, 2016, Sunseri signed to the Patriots' practice squad. He was released by the Patriots on October 24, 2016.

San Francisco 49ers
On November 1, 2016, Sunseri was signed to the 49ers' practice squad. He was promoted to the active roster on November 22, 2016.

On September 1, 2017, Sunseri was waived by the 49ers.

Coaching career

Alabama
In 2019 Sunseri spent the season as a graduate assistant at Alabama, his alma mater. He was coaching alongside his brother, Tino, who also was a graduate assistant and his father, Sal, who was the linebackers coach.

New England
In 2020 Vinnie was hired by the New England Patriots in a support staff role.

Personal life
Sunseri's father is Sal Sunseri, former linebackers coach for the Oakland Raiders, and his older brother is Tino Sunseri, who played quarterback for the Saskatchewan Roughriders.

References

External links
Alabama Crimson Tide bio 

1993 births
Living people
American football safeties
Alabama Crimson Tide football players
Alabama Crimson Tide football coaches 
New England Patriots players 
New England Patriots coaches
New Orleans Saints players
Players of American football from Alabama
San Francisco 49ers players
Sportspeople from Tuscaloosa, Alabama